Noothankal or Nuthankal is a village in Suryapet district of the Indian state of Telangana.It is located in Nuthankal mandal of Suryapet division in Suryapet district..It is located 25km from the district headquarters Suryapet.

References

External links

Villages in Suryapet district
Mandal headquarters in Suryapet district